Milwaukee riot may refer to:

 1967 Milwaukee riot
 2016 Milwaukee riots